Lynn Davis (born July 12, 1958) is an American singer, songwriter, musician, and record producer. She rose to prominence after joining The George Duke Band in 1977. During her time with the band, she sang lead vocals on some of their biggest hits: "I Want You for Myself", "Party Down", and "Thief in the Night". Under the guidance of Epic Records musician and mentor George Duke, Davis continued booking success by contributing background vocals and writing songs for many singers including Tracie Spencer, La Toya Jackson, Patrice Rushen, Anita Baker, and many other singers.

Davis's musical genre has varied throughout her career including R&B, funk, soul, and pop. Her artistic influences include George Duke, Chaka Khan, Marvin Gaye, and Earth, Wind, and Fire. 

Throughout her career, Davis has written songs and contributed background vocals for over 100 different singers and musical groups. Known for her wide, high-reaching vocal range, she is recognized as one of the most successful and musical recorded session vocalists of the era. She has also been a back-up singer for a number of famous artists, including Marvin Gaye, Stevie Wonder, and Toshinobu Kubota, as well as toured with Yanni for a short period of time, where her popularity has grown among worldwide audiences.

Early life
Lynn Blythe Davis was born in Jamestown, California, to Adeline Davis (née Livingston) and Thomas Davis, a Baptist minister at a local church. Lynn attended Narbonne High School in Los Angeles, California, where she enrolled in dance classes. Her singing talent was discovered when she began performing in school talent shows. Lynn's interest in music and performing continued after winning a school talent show at age sixteen along with her friends. In 1975, Davis and Elaine Norwood entered the Battle of the Bands: Hollywood Bowl competition under the group name "Shades of Love". The duo won the contest, becoming the first vocal act in the history of the competition to win. After graduating high school at the age of 17, she received a message from a friend to audition for The George Duke Band.

Career

1977–1987: The George Duke Band
At the age of 18, Lynn began a professional singing career when she joined singer/musician George Duke and his band for his tour. During this time, The George Duke Band consisted of George Duke, Josie James, Sheila E., Napoleon Murphy Brock, Charles Foster Johnson, Byron Miller, and Leon "Ndugu" Chancler. In 1978, Lynn contributed background vocals on the title-track album "No One Home" by Argentine composer/pianist Lalo Schifrin. In the same year, she contributed background vocals along with The George Duke Band on Flora Purim's album Carry On. In 1979, Lynn contributed background vocals on the songs "Summer Breezin'" and "I Need You Now", which were featured on George Duke's album A Brazilian Love Affair. In mid-1979, Lynn became the featured vocalist on the single "I Want You for Myself", which was released on George Duke's album Master of the Game. The single charted at number 23 on Billboard's Hot R&B chart and on the Hot Dance Club Songs' chart. In the same year, Lynn began providing background vocals for singer Patrice Rushen, whom she met during the recording sessions with Lalo Schifrin. The songs were featured on Rushen's hit album Pizzazz.

In 1980, Lynn began contributing background vocals for La Toya Jackson's self-titled debut album. In the same year, she also contributed background vocals and began writing songs for Patrice Rushen's album Posh. Lynn also appears on the album as a guest and featured vocalist for "This Is All I Really Know", a song she wrote for Rushen's album. For a brief time, Davis joined the band Twennynine and contributed vocals to their first album Best of Friends. Davis was also present with the band when they performed on American Bandstand. In 1981, Lynn recorded a cover version of Earth, Wind, and Fire's hit single After the Love Has Gone for Stanley Turrentine's album Tender Togetherness. In the same year, she also contributed background vocals for Syreeta Wright's album Set My Love in Motion and Greg Phillinganes's album Significant Gains. In late 1981, she recorded background vocals for Billy Preston & Syreeta Wright's duet album Billy Preston & Syreeta. In 1982, Lynn was featured on Jeffrey Osborne's debut single "I Really Don't Need No Light", which appeared on his self-titled debut album. Lynn also appears a background vocalist on his song "Ain't Nothin' Missin'" and "Baby", which also appear on his album. Later that year, Lynn once again provided background vocals and wrote songs for Patrice Rushen to appear on her hit album, Straight from the Heart.

In early 1983, Lynn joined The Gene Dunlap Band. The band released their first album, entitled Tired of Being a Nice Guy. Lynn returned to the George Duke Band and they released their album Guardian Of The Light. Lynn later toured with the George Duke Band for their worldwide tour. During the tour, the George Duke Band recorded their live album Live in Tokyo, Japan 1983, which was also released on DVD. Later that year, Lynn joined Marvin Gaye's Sexual Healing Tour as a backup vocalist. The tour also featured, fellow George Duke Band member, Sheila E. and her brother Peter Michael Escovedo. Lynn continued to provide background vocals on Duke's following albums: "Rendezvous" (1984), "Super Keyboards" (1984), "Thief in the Night" (1985), and "George Duke" (1986).

In 1985, she recorded two songs that would appear on Rodney Franklin's album Marathon; "Stay On in the Groove" and a duet song "Love Is the Answer" with Darryl Coley. In 1986, Lynn recorded two songs "The First Time" and "It's Your Turn", which were featured in the film Flying: Dream To Believe. In 1987, George Duke formed a R&B group called "101 North", which Lynn was briefly a part of along with fellow George Duke Band members Josie James, Napoleon Murphy Brock, and Carl Carwell. The group released their self-titled debut album in August 1987.

1987–1995: Touring with Toshinobu Kubota and Yanni
In 1987, Lynn was introduced to uprising Japanese singer Toshinobu Kubota, who was impressed with her stage performance during the Japan Aid 2nd Festival in October 1987. Later that year, Lynn re-located to Japan and began recording regularly with Kubota and eventually became a backup singer for him during his "I Need Your Funky Thang Tour". In the same year, Lynn met Japanese singer/musician Hiroshi Satoh. Satoh produced a song for Lynn called "Lady of the Nile" and a duet song with Satoh entitled "Together", which appeared on his album Future File.

In 1988, she was featured on Kubota's single "Indigo Waltz" from his third album Such A Funky Thang!. In the same year, Lynn returned to America and co-wrote as well as produced songs for Gary Taylor, Paul Jackson, Jr., Alfonz Jones, Anita Baker, Jeffrey Osborne, Evelyn "Champagne" King, Stacy Lattisaw, Howard Hewett, Deniece Williams, and many other singers. She also joined Chaka Khan for her European Tour.

In 1989, Lynn appeared on Toshinobu Kubota's single "Give You My Love". The song peaked at number 3 on the Oricon Singles Chart, selling over 150,000 copies in Japan. In 1990, Lynn made a guest appearance Kubota's fourth album Bonga Wanga, in which she sings background vocals on the lead single "Be Wannabe". In the same year, Lynn and Toshinobu Kubota performed a live cover of Roberta Flack and Donny Hathaway's single "The Closer I Get to You" on a Japan's national music program. In 1991, Lynn joined Toshinobu Kubota during his "Bonga Wanga Spring Tour" as a backup singer. After the conclusion of the tour, she parted ways with the singer. After returning to America, Lynn began providing background vocals and writing songs on many albums for Phil Perry, Diane Schuur, Tevin Campbell, Patti Austin, Aretha Franklin, Phyllis Hyman, and Peabo Bryson.

In 1992, she began recording with Go West. She contributed background vocals on the lead single "Faithful" as well as "Tell Me" and "King of Wishful Thinking" for their album Indian Summer. She contributed background vocals for Kenny G's album Breathless. In the same year, Lynn re-joined long-time friend George Duke and performed on his album, Snapshot.

In the summer of 1993, Lynn was asked to tour with Greek-American composer Yanni. Along with Darlene Koldenhoven, she performed the song "Aria" during each concert. She continued to tour with Yanni throughout the end of 1995, during end of his Yanni Live, The Symphony Concerts 1995. The performances were recorded live and released on two of Yanni's live DVD: Live at the Acropolis (1994) and Live at Royal Albert Hall (1995).

1996–present: Later career
In 1996 and 1997, she contributed background vocals for albums that would be released by Eros Ramazzotti, Celine Dion, Vonda Shepard, and Puff Johnson. In 1998, she was contributed background vocals for the Whitney Houston and Mariah Carey single "When You Believe". In 2000, she recorded with Elton John and Tim Rice for their collaboration album, The Road to El Dorado.

In 2001, Davis appeared on Pat Thomi's album Remote Control as a guest vocalist on the song "Love's Own Time". Davis would later go on to record music with Gerald Albright, Laura Pausini, Cerrone, Meat Loaf, The Mooney Suzuki, Frank McComb, and Lynne Fiddmont.

In 2008, Davis reunited with George Duke and the original members of The George Duke Band to record "Dukey Treats" and "Mercy" for his album "Dukey Treats". In August 2013, Davis briefly reunited with The George Duke Band at the George Duke Memorial Service. Along with her band mates, she gave a brief commentary about her mentor George Duke. She also performed "Brazilian Love Affair" with The George Duke Band and Stanley Clarke.

In October 2022, Davis released the first single "Can I Come Over" from her forthcoming album Lynn Davis from the Vault on her independent label Bella Records.

Artistry
Regarding her voice type, Davis is a lyric soprano. Davis possesses a five-octave vocal range, and has the ability to reach notes beyond the 6th octave. During her time with the George Duke Band, she often took on the role of singing the high vocal parts of the songs as with "Funkin' for the Thrill" and "Stand With Your Man". Duke stated, "The addition of Lynn Davis made a huge difference in what I was able to write. I composed with the band in mind, utilizing each of their personal musical strengths."

Although Davis has not released a solo album, she has recorded full-length albums with musical groups: 101 North, Gene Dunlap Band, and Twennynine. Her music is generally R&B, but she has written songs for other musical artists that incorporates pop, soul, rock, disco, and funk into the music. She is also fluent in singing Italian and Japanese.

Discography

Singles
 "Can I Come Over"

Tours
 1979: George Duke Band Tour (with George Duke)
 1982: Sexual Healing Tour (with Marvin Gaye)
 1983: Guardian of the Light Tour (with George Duke)
 1984: The Woman in Red Tour (with Stevie Wonder)
 1986-87: George Duke Tour (with George Duke)
 1988: European Tour (with Chaka Khan)
 1989: I Need Your Funky Thang! Tour (with Toshinobu Kubota)
 1990: Bonga Wanga Tour (with Toshinobu Kubota)
 1993-95: Yanni Live, The Symphony Concerts (with Yanni)

References

External links
 
 
 
 

Living people
1958 births
20th-century American actresses
21st-century American actresses
African-American actresses
African-American Christians
African-American women singer-songwriters
African-American pianists
American women pianists
African-American record producers
Record producers from California
American dance musicians
American evangelists
Women evangelists
American women pop singers
American gospel singers
American music arrangers
American rhythm and blues singer-songwriters
American session musicians
American sopranos
American soul singers
Elektra Records artists
Epic Records artists
Singers with a five-octave vocal range
20th-century American pianists
21st-century American pianists
American women record producers
20th-century African-American women singers
21st-century African-American women singers